Acanthogonatus huaquen is a mygalomorph spider of Chile, its name referring to its type locality: Huaquén, Chile. Males are recognized from other two-clawed Acanthogonatus by the bulb with a lateral keel delimiting a concave area; females by the spermathecae with an almost conical basal mound and its duct arising from its tip (similar spermathecae occur in A. franki).

Description
Female: total length ; cephalothorax length , width ; cephalic region length , width ; fovea width ; medial ocular quadrangle (OQ) length , width ; labium length , width ; sternum length , width . Its cephalic region is convex. Its labium possesses 2 cuspules. A well-developed serrula is present. Its sternal sigilla is submarginal and long, and its sternum is weakly rebordered. Chelicerae: rastellum formed by attenuate setae. It is coloured as the male.
Male: total length ; cephalothorax length , width ; cephalic region length , width ; OQ length , width ; labium length , width ; sternum length , width . Its labium has 2 very small cuspules. A well-developed serrula is present. Its sternal sigilla  is small, shallow and oval, and its sternum is strongly rebordered. Chelicerae: rastellum formed by weak setae. Cheliceral tumescence present and ventrally protruding. Its metatarsus is almost straight (slightly curved, with its prolateral side being concave). Cephalothorax and legs are a dark brown, while its abdomen is yellowish in colour and densely mottled, covered with dark hairs; its entire body is covered with a golden pubescence.

Distribution
With A. campanae and A. pissii, A. huaquen is one of the most common spiders of the genus in central Chile (Regions IV and V). It has not been found in Region Metropolitana, where A. quilocura seems to replace it.

Taxonomy and Behaviour
Goloboff (1995) states there may be more than one species included in his description study. Specimens from Quereo and Caleta Oscura were observed to have longer, spiraled spermathecal ducts; they may represent a different species.
This species builds open burrows, lined with a dense layer of silk. In forest ecosystems, the spider prefers more forested parts (not necessarily too moist); they are very common in the open grassland.

References

External links

 ADW entry

ZipcodeZoo entry

Pycnothelidae
Spiders of South America
Spiders described in 1995
Endemic fauna of Chile